Megan Elizabeth Laura Diana Follows (born March 14, 1968) is a Canadian-American actress and director. She is known for her role as Anne Shirley in the 1985 Canadian television miniseries Anne of Green Gables and its two sequels. From 2013 to 2017, she starred as Catherine de' Medici, Queen of France, in the television drama series Reign.

Early life
Follows was born in Toronto, Ontario, the youngest of four children, in an acting family. Her father was Canadian theatre actor and director Ted Follows and her mother is Canadian actress Dawn Greenhalgh. Her parents later divorced.

Her three siblings are all in the entertainment industry. Her elder sister Edwina is a writer, while her brother Laurence and sister Samantha Follows (who is married to American actor Sean O'Bryan) are also actors.

Career

Beginnings
Her first acting job came at the age of nine, when she landed a spot in a commercial for Bell Canada. She was directed to make an impudent gesture out of a school bus window – like sticking out her tongue - but ended up making a rather obscene adult gesture instead. She found steady work in Canada, appearing in a few TV series such as Matt and Jenny, The Baxters, and The Littlest Hobo, in which she guest-starred with her entire family in a three-part episode. She also starred in the short films The Olden Days Coat (1981) and Boys and Girls (1983), the latter of which won an Academy Award for Best Short Subject.

Anne of Green Gables
Follows' breakthrough occurred when she was cast as Anne Shirley in the 1985 miniseries Anne of Green Gables (as well as its two sequels). The part of "Anne" was a coveted role that she won over 3,000 other young girls when director, producer, and writer Kevin Sullivan chose her despite early worries during the audition process that she might be too old for the part. The miniseries, wholly produced in Canada, became successful around the world, and remains to this day the highest-rated drama in Canadian television history.

Her performances earned her two Gemini awards as best actress for the first two miniseries, Anne of Green Gables and Anne of Green Gables: The Sequel, and a Gemini nomination for the third Anne installment, Anne of Green Gables: The Continuing Story. She did not reprise the role for the fourth film, Anne of Green Gables: A New Beginning, and Barbara Hershey took over the role.

Television
Follows has made a number of appearances on both Canadian and U.S. television. In 1989, she starred in an episode of The Ray Bradbury Theater, "The Dwarf". In 1991 she starred with actors David Soul and David Morse in the made-for-television movie Cry in the Wild: The Taking of Peggy Ann in the titular role. The plot is based on the true story of the abduction of Peggy Ann Bradnick by an ex-convict and ex-mental patient William Diller Hollenbaugh which took place in Shade Gap, Pennsylvania on May 11, 1966. It aired on NBC on May 6, 1991. In 1995, as Megan Porter Follows (as she was then known, by her married name) starred in The Outer Limits episode "The Choice", along with Thora Birch. In Canada, she appeared in a popular made-for-TV movie, Hockey Night, around the time she appeared in Anne of Green Gables. She played Cathy, a young girl who played hockey on a previously all-male team. Other Canadian television appearances include leading roles in the period drama Under the Piano and police drama Major Crime.

In 2005, she guest-starred in the Canadian ensemble drama Robson Arms as one of the tenants of the Robson Arms apartment complex. She also appeared in the hospital drama Open Heart as a nurse fighting a physician of malpractice, and in Shania: A Life in Eight Albums, as the mother of Canadian singer Shania Twain. Most recently, she starred as Booky's mother in the three movie adaptations of Bernice Thurman Hunter's "Booky" series: Booky Makes Her Mark, Booky and the Secret Santa, and Booky's Crush.

Among her earliest American television appearances were roles in The Facts of Life (as a cousin of Jo Polniaczek in Episode 23 of Season 3 that was intended as a backdoor pilot for a proposed spin-off) in 1982, and in the short-lived series Domestic Life as Martin Mull's character's daughter in 1984. She appeared in two TV movies, Sin of Innocence and Shattered ... If Your Kid's On Drugs (both 1986). In 1993–94, she was part of the ensemble in the CBS television series Second Chances. Since 2000, she has appeared on Law & Order, ER, The X-Files, CSI: Crime Scene Investigation, CSI: Miami, Cold Case, and Lie to Me, among others. She has appeared in the Canadian television series, Heartland, for several episodes as Ty Borden's mother. She has also regularly directed Heartland.

In 2004, Follows was part of the ensemble cast of the Hallmark movie Plainsong, which included Aidan Quinn, Rachel Griffiths, and America Ferrera. In 2009, she made a guest appearance on Brothers and Sisters. In 2011, she had a guest role on House. In 2012, she played Beth in Hollywood Heights. Also in 2012 she appeared as Alice Stewart in one episode of Longmire, and in the Starz series World Without End, playing Lady Maud. In 2013, Follows was cast as Catherine de' Medici on Reign, a historical drama series on The CW, based on the early life of Mary, Queen of Scots. The series ran for four seasons.

In 2018, it was announced that Follows would be the lead director on Held, a psychological web series produced by marblemedia. She also has a recurring role as the mother of the titular character on Wynonna Earp.

In 2020, it was announced that Follows will direct the psychological thriller film Maternal, her debut as a film director. The film is slated to star Amybeth McNulty.

Film
Follows has appeared in a number of feature films. She co-starred with Corey Haim and Gary Busey in the 1985 film adaptation of Stephen King's novella, Silver Bullet. In 1990, she was the voice of Clara from the cartoon Christmas film The Nutcracker Prince. Her later film credits include Christmas Child, A Foreign Affair (2003; released on DVD as Two Brothers and a Bride), and a cameo in Laurie Lynd's Breakfast with Scot. She also had a brief uncredited cameo as a grocery store clerk in the movie I Am Number Four (2011).

Theatre
Even though the career of Follows' parents was anchored in the theatre, she did not appear in many stage productions until the 2000s. Her first stage credit was in The Effect of Gamma Rays on Man-in-the-Moon Marigolds, in which she starred alongside her mother, Dawn, and her sister, Samantha, in 1988 in Toronto. In 1992, she was offered the role of Juliet in the Stratford Festival's production of Romeo and Juliet, which she reprised the following year in Los Angeles. Other notable stage credits include A Doll's House (Minneapolis' Guthrie Theater), Othello (Edmonton's Citadel Theatre and Ottawa's National Arts Centre), Uncle Vanya (Atlantic Theatre Festival), and Noël Coward's Hay Fever, in which she appeared with her siblings, and which was directed by her father.

Recent years have seen the return of Follows on stage as a regular of the Toronto-based Soulpepper Theatre Company. In 2005, she had the leading role of May in their production of Fool for Love by Sam Shepard. The following year, she took on the role of Annie in Tom Stoppard's The Real Thing which ran at Ottawa's National Arts Centre as a co-production between Soulpepper and NAC English Theatre. Following this run, the play also made its way to Toronto as part of Soulpepper's 2006 season at the Young Centre for the Performing Arts. In 2007, she played the role of Marlene in the summer production of Caryl Churchill's Top Girls, again with the Soulpepper Theatre Company.

Soulpepper's 2008 season, marking the company's ten year anniversary, signaled the continuation of Megan's prolific theatre career. Just like the past season, she appeared in two productions. The first was Marsha Norman's 'night, Mother, in which she co-starred opposite her real-life mother, Canadian actress Dawn Greenhalgh. The second was Soulpepper's remount of its critically acclaimed 2007 production of Caryl Churchill's Top Girls.

She returned to the stage in 2010 in Mirvish Productions's revival of Churchill's Cloud 9. In 2011, she returned to the stage to star in the Canadian premiere of Melissa James Gibson's This at the Vancouver Playhouse directed by Amiel Gladstone and, in 2012, she starred in the lead role of "Penelope" at the Nightwood Theatre's production of The Penelopiad.

Personal life
In 1991, Follows married Christopher David Porter, a Canadian gaffer and photographer she met on the set of Deep Sleep. They have two children, Lyla Anne Porter (born 1991) and Russell Porter (born 1994). The couple divorced in 1996. Follows was subsequently in a long-term relationship with actor Stuart Hughes; they broke up in about 2010.

Humanitarian work
Follows has served as a spokeswoman for the relief organization World Vision Canada. She travelled to both Rwanda and Tanzania as a spokeswoman and a photographer. She also participated in the 2005 benefit concert Canada for Asia held to support the relief efforts for Asia after the 2004 Indian Ocean earthquake and tsunami.

She travelled to Cambodia in 2007 with director Heather Connell to film Small Voices: Stories of Cambodia's Children, a documentary about how the children of Cambodia living on the street and garbage dumps face their living conditions amid poverty and abuse and how they view their own future.

Follows is also a member of the Canadian charity Artists Against Racism.

Awards and nominations

References

External links
 

1968 births
20th-century American actresses
20th-century Canadian actresses
21st-century American actresses
21st-century Canadian actresses
Actresses from Toronto
American film actresses
American television actresses
American voice actresses
Canadian child actresses
Canadian emigrants to the United States
Canadian film actresses
Canadian Shakespearean actresses
Canadian stage actresses
Canadian television actresses
Canadian voice actresses
Canadian Screen Award winners
Living people
People with acquired American citizenship
University High School (Los Angeles) alumni
Canadian television directors
Canadian women television directors